The 1990–91 New Mexico State Aggies men's basketball team represented New Mexico State University in the 1990–91 college basketball season. This was Neil McCarthy's 6th season as head coach. The Aggies played their home games at Pan American Center and competed in the Big West Conference. They finished the season 23–6, 15–3 in Big West play to earn a second-place finish in the conference regular season standings. They earned an at-large bid to the NCAA tournament as No. 6 seed in the West region, but fell in the first round to No. 11 seed Creighton, 64–56.

Roster

Schedule and results

|-
!colspan=9 style=| Regular season

|-
!colspan=9 style=|Big West tournament

|-
!colspan=9 style=|NCAA tournament

Rankings

NBA draft

References

New Mexico State
New Mexico State
New Mexico State Aggies men's basketball seasons
Aggies
Aggies